Allium acuminatum, also known as the tapertip onion or Hooker's onion, is a species in the genus Allium native to North America.

Distribution
It is found the Western United States and Canada. It has been reported from every state west of the Rocky Mountains, plus British Columbia.

Description
Allium acuminatum produces bulbs that are spherical, less than 2 cm across and smelling like onions.Turner, Nancy J. Food Plants of Interior First Peoples (Victoria: UBC Press, 1997)   Scape is up to 40 cm tall, wearing an umbel of as many as 40 flowers. The flowers are pink to purple with yellow anthers. The plant also produces two or three grooved leaves which tend to wither prior to bloom. Its native habitats include open, rocky slopes, among brush and pines.

The onions were eaten by first peoples in southern British Columbia.  They were harvested in either early spring or late fall and usually cooked in pits. Both the bulb and the flowering stalk are edible; however, in the culinary arts, the stalk possesses a more pleasant flavour.

References

External links
 
Jepson Manual Treatment
USDA Plants Profile
Flora of North America

acuminatum
Flora of the Northwestern United States
Flora of the Southwestern United States
Flora of British Columbia
Flora of California
Onions
Plants described in 1838
Taxa named by William Jackson Hooker
Flora without expected TNC conservation status